Dr Lorenzo Nodarse (1 April 1909 — 20 May 1994) was Cuban tennis player.

Born in Havana, Nodarse featured in four Davis Cup ties for Cuba during the 1930s and was a three-time silver medalist at the Central American and Caribbean Games.

Nodarse, a trained lawyer, served as a Davis Cup referee and Cuban sports commissioner in his career post tennis. He left communist Cuba for the United States, settling in Texas City.

See also
List of Cuba Davis Cup team representatives

References

External links
 
 

1909 births
1994 deaths
Cuban male tennis players
Central American and Caribbean Games medalists in tennis
Central American and Caribbean Games silver medalists for Cuba
Competitors at the 1935 Central American and Caribbean Games
Competitors at the 1938 Central American and Caribbean Games
Competitors at the 1950 Central American and Caribbean Games
Sportspeople from Havana
Cuban emigrants to the United States
20th-century Cuban people